Giovanni Tocci (born 31 August 1994) is an Italian diver. He competed in the men's synchronized 3 metre springboard at the 2016 Summer Olympics, where he and Andrea Chiarabini finished 6th out of 8 teams.

At the 2018 European Championships in Glasgow, Tocci won a silver in the men's 1 metre springboard.

References

External links

1994 births
Living people
Divers at the 2016 Summer Olympics
Italian male divers
Olympic divers of Italy
Divers at the 2010 Summer Youth Olympics
Universiade medalists in diving
Sportspeople from Cosenza
European Championships (multi-sport event) silver medalists
Universiade bronze medalists for Italy
Medalists at the 2017 Summer Universiade
Divers at the 2020 Summer Olympics
21st-century Italian people
20th-century Italian people